Game Over is the debut album by thrash metal band Nuclear Assault, released in 1986.

The cassette version of Game Over featured a track entitled "Lesbians", which did not appear on the CD version. However, this track was later performed on their 1992 live album Live at the Hammersmith Odeon.

Critical reception

In 2005, Game Over was ranked number 287 in Rock Hard magazine's book of The 500 Greatest Rock & Metal Albums of All Time.

Track listing

Personnel
Nuclear Assault
 John Connelly  – vocals, guitar
 Anthony Bramante – guitar
 Danny Lilker – bass
 Glenn Evans – drums

Additional musicians
 Chad McGloughlin – guest performance on "Brain Death"

Production
 Alex Perialas – producer with Nuclear Assault, engineer
 Tom Coyne – mastering at Frankford/Wayne, New York
 Ed Repka – album design and cover art
 Steve Sinclair - executive producer

References

External links
BNR Metal band discography page

Nuclear Assault albums
1986 debut albums
Albums produced by Alex Perialas
Albums with cover art by Ed Repka
Combat Records albums